The Alternativa Libertaria/FdCA is a platformist anarchist political organisation in Italy. It was originally established in 1985 through the fusion of the Revolutionary Anarchist Organisation (or ORA) and the Tuscan Union of Anarchist Communists (or UCAT). In 1986 the Congress of the ORA/UCAT adopted the name FdCA (Federazione dei Comunisti Anarchici). In 2014 it took its current name. It has offices and member groups in various Italian regions as well as in Switzerland.
 
It is part of the international anarchist communist movement, and traces its roots to the historically important organisational theories of the Organisational Platform of the General Union of Anarchists, first put forward in France in 1926 by Russian refugees including Nestor Makhno, Ida Mett and Piotr Arshinov. From these roots, it draws its founding principles:
Unity of theory and strategy;
Tactical homogeneity;
A federal structure; and
Internal collective responsibility for militant activities.

Its highest internal decision-making body is its National Congress (composed of all members) which elects a Council of Delegates that manages the organisation between congresses.

Its political activities tend towards the self-organisation of its base of support through political struggle, in the workplace and social arena alike, and in labour unions as well as other political movements. It encourages close study of the civil economy and the evolution of capitalist political institutions.

The Alternativa Libertaria/FdCA was a member of the now-defunct International Libertarian Solidarity network. Today, together with other platformist and especifista organisations around the world, the Alternativa Libertaria/FdCA participates in the running of the Anarkismo.net website. Along with 7 other organisations, it set up the Anarkismo European Coordination in February 2011.

References

External links
Alternativa Libertaria/FdCA official website
Anarkismo.net Anarchist communist news and discussion site

Anarchist organisations in Italy
Far-left politics in Italy

Platformist organizations
Anarchist Federations